Bacchus is a ghost town in Salt Lake County, Utah, United States.

Description
The former community was located on State Route 111 in the western edge of the Salt Lake Valley, near the Oquirrh Mountains. It was established in 1915 when the Hercules Powder Company opened an explosives plant in the town. With improved transportation, the workers moved to more favorable locations, and the town deteriorated into a ghost town between 1930 and 1960. The area is now owned by Northrop Grumman (formerly ATK Aerospace).

See also

 List of ghost towns in Utah

References

External links

Ghost towns in Utah
Populated places in Salt Lake County, Utah
Wasatch Front
Salt Lake City metropolitan area
Populated places established in 1915
1915 establishments in Utah
Hercules Inc.
Company towns in Utah